WCRS (1450 kHz) is an AM radio station licensed to Greenwood, South Carolina, United States.  The station is licensed by the Federal Communications Commission (FCC) to broadcast with a transmitter power of 1 kW unlimited, non-directional.

History
WCRS signed on in the 1940s with a format similar to WFBC.

In 1979, WCRS ended its simulcast with 96.7 FM.

Peregon bought WCRS and WHZQ from Pro-Com Communications LLC in 2006.

The station featured Citadel Media's Timeless Favorites satellite feed for many years.

WCRS now carries a variety of talk shows, such as The Rush Limbaugh Show and The Laura Ingraham Show.

In February 2010, it was purchased by Anne's Entertainment Vision, Inc.

Translator
In May 2016, the station began broadcasting on FM via translator station W253BL.

References

External links

CRS
News and talk radio stations in the United States
Radio stations established in 1967